Bluegrass was a Bluegrass music satellite radio channel on Sirius Satellite Radio channel 65 and DISH Network channel 6065

The channel was merged with XM Satellite Radio's Bluegrass Junction in November 2008, following the merger of the two services.

See also
 List of Sirius Satellite Radio stations

External links
 Sirius Bluegrass

Defunct radio stations in the United States